Miedema's model is a semi-empirical approach for estimating the heat of formation of solid or liquid metal alloys and compounds in the framework of thermodynamic calculations for metals and minerals. It was developed by the Dutch scientist Andries Rinse Miedema (15 November 1933 – 28 May  1992) while working at Philips Natuurkundig Laboratorium. It may provide or confirm basic enthalpy data needed for the calculation of phase diagrams of metals, via CALPHAD or ab initio quantum chemistry methods.

History 
Miedema introduced his approach in several papers, beginning in 1973 in Philips Technical Review Magazine with "A simple model for alloys".

Miedema described his motivation with "Reliable rules for the alloying behaviour of metals have long been sought. There is the qualitative rule that states that the greater the difference in the electronegativity of two metals, the greater the heat of formation - and hence the stability. Then there is the Hume-Rothery rule, which states that two metals that differ by more than 15% in their atomic radius will not form substitutional solid solutions. This rule can only be used reliably (90 % success) to predict poor solubility; it cannot predict good solubility. The author has proposed a simple atomic model, which is empirical like the other two rules, but nevertheless has a clear physical basis and predicts the alloying behaviour of transition metals accurately in 98 % of cases. The model is very suitable for graphical presentation of the data and is therefore easy to use in practice." 

Free web based applications include Entall  and Miedema Calculator. The latter was  reviewed and improved in 2016, with an extension  of the method. The original Algol program was ported to Fortran.

Informatics-guided classification of miscible and immiscible binary alloy systems

Miedema's approach has been applied to the classification of miscible and immiscible systems of binary alloys. These are relevant in the design of multicomponent alloys. A comprehensive classification of alloying behavior for 813 binary alloy systems consisting of transition and lanthanide metals. "Impressively, the classification by the miscibility map yields a robust validation on the capability of the well-known Miedema’s theory (95% agreement) and shows good agreement with the HTFP method (90% agreement)." These  2017 results demonstrate that "a state-of-the art physics-guided data mining can provide an efficient pathway for knowledge discovery in the next generation of materials design".

Appendix: Basic Miedema Model Parameters 

This Table, reports the three main Miedema parameters for the elements of the Periodic table for whom the model is applicable.

These are original parameters  which are  after page 24 of the book  after F.R. De Boer, R. Boom, W.C.M. Mattens, A.R. Miedema and A.K. Niessen  Cohesion in Metals. Transition Metal Alloys (1988),  

The above list of parameters should be considered as a starting point, which could yield such data (results after Fortran program made available by Emre Sururi Tasci 

improved data may be found in more recent publications; possibly, in the near future, improvement or insisight of  these data could be provided by the extended Calphad databases open collections available at NIMS For instance for Fe-X binary phase diagrams, a list of available databases is as presented in this link and more specifically in this table:

References

See also

 Phase diagram
 Gibbs energy
 CALPHAD
 Intermetallic compound
 Enthalpy of mixing 
 Computational thermodynamics

Alloys
Solid-state chemistry
Metallurgy
Materials_science
Thermodynamic free energy